Alejandro Maccioni Seisdedos (21 February 1919 — 5 May 2014) was a Chilean chess player and pediatrician.

Biography
In the 1940s and 1950s Maccioni was one of the leading chess players in Chile, participant of many South American international chess tournaments.

Maccioni played for Chile in the Chess Olympiad:
 In 1950, at fourth board in the 9th Chess Olympiad in Dubrovnik (+6, =5, -4).

After education Maccioni was a doctor. He worked as Head of the Pediatric Service of the Hospital Clínico San Borja Arriarán in Santiago de Chile at the beginning of the 1970s until retirement.

References

External links
 
 Alejandro Maccioni Seisdedos chess games at 365chess.com

1919 births
2014 deaths
Chilean pediatricians
Chilean chess players
Chess Olympiad competitors